The women's team time trial of the 1989 UCI Road World Championships cycling event took place on 23 August 1989 in Chambéry, France. The course was 50.9 km long and went from Chambéry to Le Touvet and back to Chambéry.

Final classification

Source

References

1989 UCI Road World Championships
UCI Road World Championships – Women's team time trial
UCI